Schroederichthys is a genus of catsharks in the family Scyliorhinidae.

Species
 Schroederichthys bivius (J. P. Müller & Henle, 1838) (narrowmouthed catshark)
 Schroederichthys chilensis (Guichenot, 1848) (redspotted catshark)
 Schroederichthys maculatus S. Springer, 1966 (narrowtail catshark)
 Schroederichthys saurisqualus Soto, 2001 (lizard catshark)
 Schroederichthys tenuis S. Springer, 1966 (slender catshark)

Etymology
The genus name Schroederichthys honors ichthyologist William Charles Schroeder.

References
 

 
Shark genera
 
Taxa named by Andrew Smith (zoologist)